Atonement is the eighth studio album by American metalcore band Killswitch Engage, released through Metal Blade Records on August 16, 2019. Lead single "Unleashed" was released on June 25, and followed by "I Am Broken Too" in July which would later follow up with a music video in August, as well as "The Signal Fire" shortly before the album's release. The band began a co-headlining tour of North America with Clutch in promotion of the album in July.

In November 2019, the track "Unleashed" was nominated for the Grammy Award for "Best Metal Performance", making it the third Grammy nomination for Killswitch Engage.

On May 1, 2020, the band released an EP entitled Atonement II: B-Sides for Charity on their Bandcamp, featuring six previously unreleased songs taken from the recording sessions of Atonement. 100% of the proceeds from the EP's sales were donated to the COVID-19 relief organization Center For Disaster Philanthropy, raising over $30,000.

Background and recording
The album was recorded over a period of two years, with ideas for the album beginning in 2017. Recording sessions took place on both coasts of the United States, but they were put on hold when vocalist Jesse Leach developed scar tissue on a polyp in his throat and underwent speech and vocal therapy for three months. Atonement was thus described as a "reflection of perseverance and passion through the trials and suffering of our existence" by the band, and by Leach as "musically the most diverse record we've done as a band".

Critical reception

The album received positive reviews from music critics. At Metacritic, which assigns a normalised rating out of 100 to reviews from mainstream critics, the album has an average score of 78 out of 100 based on five reviews, indicating "generally favourable reviews".

Wall of Sound writer Ricky Aarons wrote that Atonement "does what [the band's] other releases have, and that is, craft the build-ups and hooks to what we would expect to hear as a crunchy breakdown" but then the band "steadily bring us back down to the start", which "retains old-school metal fans but also attracts the more contemporary metalcore fans". Aarons concluded that "maybe what Killswitch Engage have done here is perfect, and therefore it could be their best album".

Loudwire named it one of the 50 best metal albums of 2019.

Track listing

Personnel
Credits adapted from album's liner notes.

Killswitch Engage
Jesse Leach – lead vocals
Adam Dutkiewicz – lead guitar, backing vocals, production, engineering
Joel Stroetzel – rhythm guitar, backing vocals
Mike D'Antonio – bass, art direction and layout
Justin Foley – drums

Guest musicians
Howard Jones – additional vocals on "The Signal Fire"
Chuck Billy – additional vocals on "The Crownless King"

Production
Daniel Castleman – assistant engineer
Andy Sneap – mixing, mastering
Richey Beckett – cover illustration
Travis Shinn – group photos

Charts

References

2019 albums
Killswitch Engage albums
Metal Blade Records albums